Egan Frantz (born 1986) is an American artist. He is known for producing large-scale, abstract paintings wherein passages of vivid color stand out sharply against measured visual fields.

Public collections 

His work is held in the collection of the Henry Art Gallery, University of Seattle, Washington.

Exhibitions 
Foundry, Seoul (2021)
Galerie Nagel Draxler, Berlin (2020)
Team Gallery, New York (2019)
Neuer Aachener Kunstverein, Aachen (2019) 
Gallery Nagel Draxler, Cologne (2018)
Roberts Projects, Los Angeles (2017) 
Gallery Nagel Draxler, Berlin (2016) 
Art Basel: Nova, Miami (2015)
Tilton Gallery, New York (2015)
Michael Jon Gallery, Miami (2014)
Galerie Nagel Draxler, Cologne (2014)
Art Basel: Statements, Basel (2013)
Roberts & Tilton, Los Angeles (2012)
Essl Museum, Vienna (2012)
Tomorrow, Toronto (2012) 
C L E A R I N G, New York (2012) 
Miguel Abreu Gallery, New York (2011)

Representation 
Galerie Nagel Draxler, Berlin / Cologne / Munich
Team Gallery, New York
Tilton Gallery, New York
Roberts Projects, Los Angeles

References

Further reading

External links 
 

1986 births
21st-century American painters
American conceptual artists
Living people
American contemporary painters